Stephen Michael Pryor (born July 23, 1989) is an American former professional baseball pitcher. Pryor made his MLB debut with the Seattle Mariners on June 2, 2012. He won his first game on June 8, 2012, in a combined no-hitter started by Kevin Millwood.

Career
Pryor attended Friendship Christian School in Lebanon, Tennessee, where he pitched for the school's baseball team. Undrafted out of high school, Pryor began his college baseball career at Cleveland State Community College in 2007. The Texas Rangers drafted Pryor in the 42nd round of the 2008 Major League Baseball (MLB) Draft, but he did not sign. After playing at Cleveland State for two seasons, Pryor transferred to Tennessee Technological University, where he played for the Tennessee Tech Golden Eagles as their closer. After pitching to a 4–4 win–loss record with a 5.71 earned run average, with 22 walks and 75 strikeouts, in 24 appearances for the Golden Eagles, the Mariners drafted Pryor in the fifth round of the 2010 MLB Draft, and he signed with the Mariners. He began his professional career with the Everett AquaSox of the Class A-Short Season Northwest League that year.

Pryor advanced to the Clinton LumberKings of the Class A Midwest League in August 2010. He pitched for the High Desert Mavericks of the Class A-Advanced California League and Jackson Generals of the Class AA Southern League in 2011.

MLB.com ranked Pryor as the ninth-best Mariners' prospect prior to the 2012 season. He started the 2012 season with Jackson, before receiving a promotion to the Tacoma Rainiers of the Class AAA Pacific Coast League in May.  He was called up to the majors for the first time on May 31, 2012, and made his debut against the Chicago White Sox on June 2, 2012. He got his first MLB win on June 8, as part of a combined no-hitter against the Los Angeles Dodgers in a game started by Kevin Millwood. The game was only his fourth MLB appearance. Charlie Furbush, Brandon League, Lucas Luetge, and Tom Wilhelmsen also appeared in the game for Seattle.

In April 2013, Pryor was placed on the 60-day disabled list for a torn right latissimus dorsi muscle, and on July 16, he served as a starting pitcher for the Everett AquaSox against the Vancouver Canadians. During October 2013, Pryor underwent surgery to repair triceps in his right shoulder and was shut down for the 2014 season.

On July 24, 2014, Pryor was traded to the Minnesota Twins in exchange for Kendrys Morales.

He was released by the Minnesota Twins on December 17, 2015.

References

External links

1989 births
Living people
Major League Baseball pitchers
Seattle Mariners players
Cleveland State Cougars baseball players
Tennessee Tech Golden Eagles baseball players
Everett AquaSox players
Clinton LumberKings players
High Desert Mavericks players
Jackson Generals (Southern League) players
Tacoma Rainiers players
Rochester Red Wings players
Cardenales de Lara players
American expatriate baseball players in Venezuela
People from Donelson, Tennessee